Boriziny-Vaovao is a district of Sofia in Madagascar. The capital of Boriziny-Vaovao is the city of Boriziny, formerly called Port-Bergé. The Sofia River flows into the sea in this district.

Communes
The district is further divided into 15 communes:

 Ambanjabe
 Ambodimahabibo
 Ambodisakoana
 Ambodivongo
 Amparihy
 Andranomeva
 Boriziny (Port-Bergé)
 Boriziny II
 Leanja
 Maevaranohely
 Marovato
 Tsarahasina
 Tsaratanana
 Tsiningia
 Tsinjomitondraka

References 

Districts of Sofia Region